The 30th Midsouth Emmy Awards were broadcast on February 27, 2016 in Nashville, Tennessee from the Country Music Hall of Fame.

Award Winners

COMMUNITY/PUBLIC SERVICE (PSA) SPOT – TIE

Hope to Dream, VIA Productions, Tom Strodtbeck

Nashville Rescue Mission “Home for Christmas”, WTVF, Jerry L. Walker, Doug Seegers

COMMUNITY/PUBLIC SERVICE (PSA) CAMPAIGN

(Hashtag)Brake4Buses, WNCN, Reuben Carrington, Jason Kane, Robby Thomas

COMMERCIAL SPOT

Trex “The Greatest Light Show”, The Buntin Group, Tom Gibney

COMMERCIAL CAMPAIGN

St. Thomas Health “Nothing Shall Be Impossible”, Bohan, Penny Rahe, Matt Weber

INTERSTITIAL

Zuri, Rosi, and Circle de Luz, Priceless Miscellaneous, Matthew Tyndall, Erik Button, Justin Ruckman, Tim Grant

PROMO SPOT/NEWS SAME DAY

Sports Promo with a Skosh of Weather, WCNC, Christopher Clark

PROMO SPOT/NEWS

Cyber Bullying, WNCT, Marc Morriston, Aaron Bevill, Jason Bullock

PROMO SPOT/NEWS IMAGE

WNCN Today: Go Be Great Durham, WNCN, Reuben Carrington, Jason Kane, Robby Thomas

PROMO SPOT/PROGRAM

WRAL Documentary: An Obvious Suspect, WRAL, Jay Yovanovich

PROMO SPOT/IMAGE

I  Do So Like That App From 2, WFMY, David Fields, Chris Allight

PROMO SPOT/SPORTS

Numbers — The UNC-Duke 2015 ACC Network Tease, Raycom Sports, Richard Brooke, Maxwell Brooke

PROMO CAMPAIGN

WNCN: Tools of The Trade, WNCN, Reuben Carrington, Jason Kane, Robby Thomas

SPORTSCAST

Chris Clark – All I Ever Wanted To Be Was A Sportscaster, WCNC, Christopher Clark

SPORTS NEWS FEATURE

Panthers Football: Search for New Heroes, WCNC, Christopher Clark

SPORTS PROGRAM FEATURE

Brian Stann, Raycom Sports, David Barringer

SPORTS EVENT/GAME

NHL Playoffs – Chicago Blackhawks vs. Nashville Predators – Game 5, FOX Sports Tennessee, Randy Stephens, Rohan Backfisch, Brett Newkirk, John Tackett, David White, Pete Weber, Stu Grimson, Bob Kohl, Mark Howard, Terry Crisp, Lyndsay Rowley, David Raynak

AUDIO

Bluegrass Underground, Todd Squared, Andy Kern, Adam Ellis, Bradley Baisley, Paul Fuerstenberger

MUSIC COMPOSER/ARRANGER – TIE

Miro: The Experience of Seeing, Concentrix Music and Sound Design, Fred Story

The Gift, Yamaha Entertainment Group of America, Chris Gero

EDITOR/NEWS

Chris Clark – Making People Say Wow Daily, WCNC, Christopher Clark

EDITOR/PROGRAM

Roy Williams’ Game Day Security Blanket, StoryDriven Media Group, Philip Henry

EDITOR/SHORT FORM  – TIE

Butch Jones Show Open Tease, Maul Media, Chris Vining

Mitch Martin Editing Composite, Running Pony, Mitch Martin

DIRECTOR/NEWS

Tater Directs the Five, WHNT, D. Allen “Tater” Terry

DIRECTOR/PROGRAM

An Invitation to Hope, Gemini Production Group, Steve Horswill-Johnston, Scott C. Jackson

DIRECTOR/SHORT FORM

McKenzies Mill Electronic Press Kit, Steven Knapp

NEWS SPECIAL

Policing For Profit, WTVF, Phil Williams, Bryan Staples, Kevin Wisniewski

SPECIAL EVENT COVERAGE

Sounds New Stadium Opening, WTVF, Rhonda Roberts, Lori Hinkle, Rhori Johnston

DOCUMENTARY/CULTURAL

First Language – The Race to Save Cherokee, The Language and Life Project at NC State University, Neal Hutcheson, Danica Cullinan

DOCUMENTARY/TOPICAL

NPT Reports: Aging Matters – Aging in Place, Nashville Public Television, Will Pedigo, Matthew Emigh

DOCUMENTARY/HISTORICAL

Story of Charles Scott, Raycom Sports, Jeremy Williams, Maxwell Brooke, Richard Brooke, David Daly, Cory Alexander

HISTORIC/CULTURAL PROGRAM FEATURE/SEGMENT

Our State: Hart Square, UNC-TV, Morgan Potts, Mike Burke, Steve Price, Karen Pearce, Grant Dennis, Mike Milstead, Brian Faulkner, Fred Story. Amy Pasquini

INVESTIGATIVE REPORT

Identities for Sale, WSMV, Jeremy Finley, Jason Finley

INVESTIGATIVE SERIES

The Sheriff’s Campaign, WSMV, Jeremy Finley, Jason Finley

JOURNALISTIC ENTERPRISE

Memphis on a Mission, WREG, Matthew Stein, Stephanie Scurlock. April Thompson, Richard Ransom, Gary Blankenship, Zaneta Lowe, Alex Coleman

WEATHER

February Freeze, WTVF, Ron Howes, Lelan A. Statom, Charles Neese, Kelly Cox, Chris Conte, Cuthbert Langley, Amy Watson, Jennifer Reyes

CONTINUING COVERAGE – WITHIN 24 HOURS

Riot at Woodland Hills, WSMV, Billy Hodge, Erika Kent, Justin Leach, Holly Thompson, Nick Morgan, Kara Apel, Anne McCloy

CONTINUING COVERAGE – NO TIME LIMIT

Trouble at Woodland Hills, WSMV, Jeremy Finley, Billy Hodge, Holly Thompson, Nancy Amons, Hayley Mason

INTERACTIVITY

(Hashtag)HungerFreeNC, WRAL, Shelly Leslie, Jodi Leese Glusco, Wendy Gatlin, Steve Loyd

SPOT NEWS

Durham Black Lives Matter March, WRAL, Lori Grant, Ken Smith, Mark Simpson, Kevin Davis, James A. Ford, Jr.

BREAKING NEWS

Scaffolding Collapse, WRAL, Rick Gall, Miriam K Melvin, Joseph Thomas, Laura Leslie, Monica  Laliberte, Waliya Lari, Michelle Marsh, Keyetta Mangum, Kianey Carter, Sloane Heffernan, Miranda Dotson, Jenna Auman

GENERAL ASSIGNMENT – WITHIN 24 HOURS

Match for Mary Ann, WTVF, Chris Conte

GENERAL ASSIGNMENT – NO TIME LIMIT

Swatting, WRAL, Renee Chou, Randall Kerr, Greg Clark

BUSINESS/CONSUMER REPORT

Carolina Impact / Catawba Casino: The Big Bet, WTVI, Jeff Sonier, Doug Stacker

SPECIALTY ASSIGNMENT REPORT – TIE

Alzheimer’s: Family, Music, and Hope, WKRN, Robbyn DeSpain, Samantha Fisher, Scott Mottern

WNCN Investigates: Energy Exploration in North Carolina, WNCN, Jonathan Rodriguez, Bolton      Minnick, David Hattman, Cary Gough

VIDEO JOURNALIST

Every Day between Charlotte and Demonbreun, WSMV, Forrest Sanders

VIDEO ESSAY

Hardest Day of My Life, WTVF, Ted Nelson

COMMUNITY SERVICE

(Hashtag)Brake4Buses, WNCN, Andrea Parquet-Taylor

INFORMATIONAL/INSTRUCTIONAL PROGRAM

Saving Lives: Safe and Supportive Schools in Tennessee. Vanderbilt Peabody College, Lyle Jackson

INFORMATIONAL/INSTRUCTIONAL SERIES

Tennessee’s Wild Side, The Jackson Foundation Media Productions, Doug Jackson

PUBLIC AFFAIRS

Aging Matters: Caregiving, Nashville Public Television, LaTonya Turner, Suzy Hence

CHILDREN’S PROGRAM

Mother Goose Club, Sockeye Media, Sona Jho, Harry Jho

ARTS

Everyone Has a Place, John S. And James L. Knight Foundation, Dennis Scholl. Marlon Johnson

ENTERTAINMENT

2014 Americana Music Honors & Awards, High Five Entertainment, Martin Fischer, Jed Hilly, Edie Lynn Hoback, Michelle Aquilato

MAGAZINE SEGMENT

Tennessee Crossroads: Eyes on LaFollette, Nashville Public Television, Will Pedigo, Matthew Emigh

MAGAZINE PROGRAM

FOX 17 Photog Special, WZTV, Bob Shrader, Ryan Brooker, Ian Bailey. Scott Simpson. Erika Kurre, James Egbert, Darin Belcher, Ryan Thornburg, Jordan Powell

LIFESTYLE PROGRAM FEATURE/SEGMENT

Rocky Mountaineer, Wide Eye Productions, Robert Van Camp

LIGHT FEATURE NEWS REPORT

Pelican 212, WTVF, Chris Conte, Nathan C Sharkey

LIGHT FEATURE NEWS SERIES

Bulger’s Beat, WSMV, Terry Bulger

SERIOUS FEATURE NEWS REPORT

Sing Me a Story, WTVF, Jason Lamb, Catherine Steward

SERIOUS FEATURE NEWS SERIES

(Hashtag)Boozeitloseit, WNCN, Jonathan Rodriguez, Cary Gough, David Hattman

GRAPHIC ARTS

Adam Shumaker- 2014-15 Graphics Composite, FOX Sports South, Adam Shumaker

ANIMATION

The Value of a Duke Education, Duke University, Robert Carson Mataxis

SET DESIGN

K-LOVE Fan Awards 2015, Go LIVE Productions, Scott Moore

LIGHTING

K-LOVE Fan Awards 2015, Go LIVE Productions, Tony Fransen

TECHNICAL ACHIEVEMENT

Bluegrass Underground, Todd Squared, Todd Mayo, Todd Jarrell, Nicholas E. Dugger, Adam Ellis, Robert Devlin, Andrew Humphries

WRITER/NEWS

Chris Conte Composite, WTVF, Chris Conte

WRITER/PROGRAM

Saving Lives, Safe and Supportive Schools in Tennessee, Vanderbilt Peabody College, Jack Isenhour

WRITER/SHORT FORM

Patrick Stage Writing Composite, Memphis Grizzlies, Patrick Stage

PHOTOGRAPHER/NEWS

Catherine Steward Photography Composite, WTVF, Catherine Steward

PHOTOGRAPHER/PROGRAM

An Invitation to Hope, Gemini Production Group, Matthew Pessoni, Scott Pessoni

PHOTOGRAPHER/SHORT FORM

Greater Memphis Trailer, Memphis Grizzlies, Nicholas Modisett

NEWSCAST/WEEKEND

Eyewitness News Sunday 6PM, WSOC, Kim Holt, Dana Ellison, Phil Orban, Andy Holt, Christopher Johnson, Stacey Minchin, Stephanie Coueignoux, Lawrence Gilligan, Ken Lemon

NEWSCAST/MORNING

February Snow Noon Newscast, WRAL, Miriam K Melvin, Keyetta Mangum, Elizabeth Gardner, Nathan Johnson, Michelle Marsh, Amanda Smith, Jenna Auman

NEWSCAST/EVENING

NewsChannel 5 at 6: Snow, WTVF, Rhonda Roberts, Rhori Johnston, Shannon Royster

NEWS EXCELLENCE

WRAL News Excellence, WRAL, Rick Gall

References

External links 
 

American television awards